This article presents the discography of the French pop singer Véronique Sanson.

Albums

Studio albums

Live albums

Compilations

Singles

 1969 : "Le printemps est là" (written by Donovan, adapted by Véronique Sanson)
 1972 : "Mariavah" b/w "Amoureuse" (Elektra 12 040)
 1972?: "Amoureuse" (French version)
 1972 : "Besoin de personne" (Elektra 12 046)
 1972 : "Comme je l'imagine" (Elektra 12 065)
 1973 : "Chanson sur une drôle de vie" (Elektra 12 083)
 1973?: "Amoureuse" (English Version) b/w "Cent fois" (Elektra 12 135)
 1974 : "Alia Soûza" (Canada)
 1974 : "Le Maudit"
 1976 : "Vancouver"
 1977 : "Féminin"
 1977 : "Bernard's song" (Canada)
 1977 : "How Many Lies"
 1979 : "Ma Révérence"
 1979 : "Celui qui n'essaie pas (ne se trompe qu'une seule fois)"
 1979 : "Toute une vie sans te voir"
 1980 : "Lerida"
 1981 : "L'amour qui bat"
 1981 : "Doux dehors, fou dedans"
 1984 : "Le temps est assassin"
 1985 : "C'est long, c'est court"
 1985 : "J'y perds des plumes"
 1988 : "Allah"
 1988 : "Un peu d'air pur et hop !"
 1989 : "Amoureuse" (symphonique)
 1989 : "Paranoïa"
 1992 : "Rien que de l'eau" – No. 6 in France
 1992 : "Panne de cœur" – No. 46 in France
 1993 : "Mon voisin"
 1993 : "Bernard's song" (live)
 1994 : "Seras-tu là ?" (live) – No. 10 in France
 1994 : "Bahia"
 1995 : "Une nuit sur ton épaule" (duet with Marc Lavoine) – No. 34 in France
 1995 : "Alia Soûza" (duet with Michel Fugain)
 1995 : "Quelques mots d'amour"
 1998 : "Un être idéal" – No. 34 in France
 1998 : "Je me suis tellement manquée"
 1998 : "Un amour qui m'irait bien"
 1999 : "Paradis blanc"
 2000 : "Si tu t'en vas"
 2000 : "Pour me comprendre"
 2000 : "Attendre" (live)
 2004 : "J'aime un homme"
 2004 : "L'homme de farandole"
 2004 : "La douceur du danger"
 2010 : "La nuit se fait attendre"
 2010 : "Qu'on me pardonne"
 2012 : "Juste pour toi"
 2012 : "Chanson sur une drôle de vie"
 2014 : "Amoureuse"
 2016 : "Et je l'appelle encore"

See also

Certifications in France

References

 Véronique Sanson discography and charts in France See: "Les Chart Runs" => Véronique SANSON" 
 Véronique Sanson discography and charts in Belgium (Wallonia)
 Véronique Sanson discography and charts in Swiss
 Véronique Sanson certifications in France

Discographies of French artists
Pop music discographies